Adrian Avrămia (born 31 January 1992) is a Romanian former professional footballer who played as a centre back for teams such as Politehnica Iași, Dinamo Brest, Irtysh Pavlodar or Foresta Suceava, among others.

Club career

Youth
Avrămia played for the youth teams of Juventus Fălticeni, Nicu Gane Fălticeni and later Politehnica Iași until its dissolution in 2010.

Politehnica Iași
In the summer of 2010 he moved to the recently formed Politehnica Iaşi in the Liga II alongside Andrei Hergheligiu. Playing in the second tier of Romanian football he had more chances to make an impact. He made his debut in senior football later that year.

In September 2011 he suffered a meniscus injury. He had to undergo surgery to repair it and was subsequently sidelined for the rest of the 2011–12 Liga II season. After he recovered from his injury, Avrămia made his Liga I debut in the 2012–13 Liga I season.

Irtysh Pavlodar
On 24 January 2018 Avrămia signed for Irtysh Pavlodar. On 26 July 2018, Avrămia left Irtysh Pavlodar by mutual consent.

Foresta Suceava
On 5 August 2019, Avrămia signed a one year-contract with Liga III side Foresta Suceava.

International career
He played for Romania U19 in the UEFA European Under-19 Football Championship, a tournament which took place in Romania.

Honours
Dinamo Brest
Belarusian Cup: 2016–17

References

External links

1992 births
Living people
People from Fălticeni
Romanian footballers
Romania youth international footballers
Romania under-21 international footballers
Association football defenders
Liga I players
Liga II players
FC Politehnica Iași (2010) players
CS Universitatea Craiova players
FC Rapid București players
ACS Foresta Suceava players
Belarusian Premier League players
FC Dynamo Brest players
Kazakhstan Premier League players
FC Irtysh Pavlodar players
Romanian expatriate footballers
Romanian expatriate sportspeople in Belarus
Expatriate footballers in Belarus
Romanian expatriate sportspeople in Kazakhstan
Expatriate footballers in Kazakhstan